Ethel Williams is the name of:
 Ethel Williams (physician)  (born 1863), doctor, suffragist, and pacifist in Newcastle upon Tyne.
 Ethel Leckwith  (born 1893), fictional character and a protagonist of the Century Trilogy by Ken Follett.
 Ethel Williams (dancer), Ethel Waters's lover